The Grand Prix de Paris was a track cycling sprint race held annually from 1894 until 1993. It was the most important competition for track sprinters alongside the UCI Track Cycling World Championships and the Grand Prix de l'UVF.

Winners

Men

Professional

Amateur

Women

References

Cycle races in France
Defunct cycling races in France
Recurring sporting events established in 1894
1894 establishments in France
Recurring sporting events disestablished in 1993
Track cycling races
1993 disestablishments in France